NA-126 Lahore-X is a newly-created constituency for the National Assembly of Pakistan. It mainly comprises the section of Lahore City Tehsil along Multan Road. It also includes smaller areas of Model Town Tehsil and Raiwind Tehsil.

Members of Parliament

2018-2022: NA-135 Lahore-XIII

Election 2018 

General elections were held on 25 July 2018.

By-election 2023 
A by-election will be held on 19 March 2023 due to the resignation of Malik Karamat Khokhar, the previous MNA from this seat.

See also
NA-125 Lahore-IX
NA-127 Lahore-XI

References 

Lahore